The 57th Directors Guild of America Awards, honoring the outstanding directorial achievements in films, documentary and television in 2004, were presented on January 29, 2005, at the Beverly Hilton. The ceremony was hosted by Carl Reiner. The nominees in the feature film category were announced on January 6, 2005 and the other nominations starting on January 10, 2005.

Winners and nominees

Film

Television

Commercials

Frank Capra Achievement Award
 Herb Adelman

Franklin J. Schaffner Achievement Award
 Stanley Faer

Diversity Award
 Steve McPherson

Presidents Award
 Gilbert Cates

References

External links
 

Directors Guild of America Awards
2004 film awards
2004 guild awards
2004 television awards
2004 in American cinema
2004 in American television
2004 awards in the United States